The Commission de la représentation électorale du Québec (English: Electoral Representation Commission) is the permanent and independent agency in Quebec with decision-making authority to periodically revise the electoral map, usually as a consequence of population shifts, in order to ensure equitable representation.

The commission consists of three persons, with the Chief Electoral Officer of Quebec as its president.

External links
 Official site
 
 Members of the Commission de la représentation électorale and biographical notes
 Address on Google Map

References

Government of Quebec